Anna Barańska – (born 8 September 1976) – Polish mountaineer,  and climber of three eight-thousanders. The first Polish woman on the North Face of Mount Everest, climbed on 21 May 2009. She was born and lives in Warsaw. She obtained her master's degrees from the Warsaw School of Economics and works in financial advisory (M&A, corporate finance). She is not a member of any mountain organization and she does not perceive herself as an alpinist. She started her mountaineering adventure in 2000 by climbing Rysy from the Slovak side. The next climbings were as follows: Gerlach 2650 m – June 2000; Triglav 2864 m – September 2001; Mont Blanc 4810 m – August 2002 ; Elbrus 5642 m – unsuccessful summit trial in August 2003; Lenin's Peak 7210 m by the normal route – June 2004.

Eight-thousanders

In 2005 Anna reached the top of Cho Oyu in Tibet by the normal route with Piotr Barabas on September 28.

Then in 2009 she took a part in Mount Everest North Face international expedition and summited as the first Polish woman on the North, Tibetan Face. The expedition, successful to her, was full of dramatic moments – one of the members died from a heart attack in CI, and another did not make it down from the summit and remained below the 3rd Step.

In 2013 (21 July), Anna successfully climbed Gasherbrum II as a member of an international expedition. On this expedition, she met her husband, an Australian citizen, whom she married a year after they met (19 June 2014).

External links 
 Anna Barańska: The first Polish woman on the North Face of Mount Everest
 Anna Barańska: My Everest – Mt Everest North Face International Expedition 2009, part 1.
 Anna Barańska: My Everest – Mt Everest North Face International Expedition 2009, part 2.
 

1976 births
Polish mountain climbers
Living people
Polish summiters of Mount Everest
Sportspeople from Warsaw
Female climbers